This Way may refer to:

Albums
 This Way (Acoustic Alchemy album) or the title song, 2007
 This Way (Hana Pestle album) or the title song, 2009
 This Way (Jewel album) or the title song (see below), 2001
 This Way, by Bruce Gilbert, 1984
 This Way, by Total Touch with Trijntje Oosterhuis, 1998

Songs
 "This Way" (Dilated Peoples song), 2004
 "This Way" (Jewel song), 2002
 "This Way", by Chris Brown from Heartbreak on a Full Moon, 2017
 "This Way", by Khalid and H.E.R. from the Superfly film soundtrack, 2018
 "This Way", by Madeline Kenney from Night Night at the First Landing, 2017
 "This Way", by Michelle Branch, 2009
 "This Way", by Mr. Scruff, 2009
 "This Way (Too Many Times)", by Don Diablo from Life Is a Festival, 2008

See also 
 Thisway, an American indie pop band 1997–2003
 This Way Up (disambiguation)
 
 That Way (disambiguation)